Gyatt may refer to:

Edward E. Gyatt (1921-1942), a United States Marine Corps private awarded the Silver Star during World War II
USS Gyatt, the name of more than one United States Navy ship